The Fargo-Moorhead Fever were a professional basketball team based in the Fargo–Moorhead metropolitan area on the North Dakota–Minnesota border. The Fever were members of the Continental Basketball Association (CBA) for two seasons, from 1992 to 1994. Steve Bontrager served as the team's head coach during their two seasons. The team played their home games at the Fargodome in Fargo, North Dakota during the 1993–94 season. The franchise was put up for sale after the 1993–94 season and an ownership group from Mexico City purchased the franchise over two other bids. The team was known as the Mexico City Aztecas during the 1994–95 season.

Jon Absey, who portrayed the Utah Jazz mascot Jazz Bear, got his start in basketball promotions as Fargo-Moorhead's mascot. His employment was terminated after management determined a stunt in which Absey rode a toboggan down the stadium's steps was too dangerous, however that stunt is now a staple of Jazz Bear's performance.

Season-by-season records

See also
Fargo-Moorhead Beez

References

Sports in Fargo, North Dakota
Continental Basketball Association teams
Basketball teams in North Dakota
1992 establishments in North Dakota
Basketball teams established in 1992
1994 disestablishments in North Dakota
Basketball teams disestablished in 1994